Robert Forsyth is bishop of Sydney.

Robert Forsyth may also refer to:

Robert Forsyth (writer) (1766–1845), Scottish writer
Robert Campbell Forsyth (born 1939), Scottish footballer

See also
Robert Forsyth Scott